In economics, total cost (TC) is the minimum dollar cost of producing some quantity of output. This is the total economic cost of production and is made up of variable cost, which varies according to the quantity of a good produced and includes inputs such as labor and raw materials, plus fixed cost, which is independent of the quantity of a good produced and includes inputs that cannot be varied in the short term  such as buildings and machinery, including possibly sunk costs.

Total cost in economics includes the total opportunity cost (benefits received from the next-best alternative) of each factor of production as part of its fixed or variable costs.

The additional total cost of one additional unit of production is called marginal cost.  

The marginal cost can also be calculated by finding the derivative of total cost or variable cost. Either of these derivatives work because the total cost includes variable cost and fixed cost, but fixed cost is a constant with a derivative of 0.  

The total cost of producing a specific level of output is the cost of all the factors of production. Often, economists use models with two inputs: physical capital, with quantity K and labor, with quantity L. Capital is assumed to be the fixed input, meaning that the amount of capital used does not vary with the level of production in the short run. The rental price per unit of capital is denoted r. Thus, the total fixed cost equals Kr. Labor is the variable input, meaning that the amount of labor used varies with the level of output. In the short run, the only way to vary output is by varying the amount of the variable input. Labor usage is denoted L and the per unit cost, or wage rate, is denoted w, so the variable cost is Lw. Consequently, total cost is fixed cost (FC) plus variable cost (VC), or TC = FC + VC = Kr+Lw. In the long run, however, both capital usage and labor usage are variable. The long run total cost for a given output will generally be lower than the short run total cost, because the amount of capital can be chosen to be optimal for the amount of output.  

Other economic models use the total variable cost curve (and therefore total cost curve) to illustrate the concepts of increasing, and later diminishing, marginal return.

In marketing, it is necessary to know how total costs divide between variable and fixed. "This distinction is crucial in forecasting the earnings generated by various changes in unit sales and thus the financial impact of proposed marketing campaigns." In a survey of nearly 200 senior marketing managers, 60% responded that they found the "variable and fixed costs" metric very useful.

Calculating cost functions

Total product (= Output, Q) = Quantity of goods
Average Variable Cost (AVC) = Total Variable Cost / Quantity of goods (This formula is cyclic with the TVC one)
Average Fixed Cost (AFC) = ATC – AVC

Total Cost  = (AVC + AFC) X Quantity of goods
Total Variable Cost = Variable cost per unit X Quantity of goods
Total Fixed Cost = TC – TVC
Marginal Cost = Change in Total Costs / Change in Quantity of goods
Marginal Product = Change in Quantity of goods / Change in Variable Factor
Marginal Revenue = Change in Total Revenue / Change in Quantity of goods
Average Product = Quantity of goods / Variable Factor
Total Revenue = Price X Quantity of goods
Average Revenue = TR / Quantity of goods
Total Product = AP X Variable Factor
Profit = TR – TC or (P-ATC)*Q
Loss = TC – TR (if positive)
Break Even Point: value of Quantity of goods where Average Revenue = Average Total Cost
Profit Maximizing Condition: Marginal Revenue = Marginal Cost
Marginal Revenue =The rate of change in Total Revenue with Quantity

Rent-Seeking
Rent-seeking was introduced by Ann O. Kruger and claims that we must use the investment of resources to create monopolies. However, the resulting monopolies impose a social cost that is already greater than the current deadweight loss, creating this distortion within the economy. We tend to look at government-created monopolies, yet there are some private monopolies we must take note of. These resources that it takes to create such a monopoly are not always successful, though, as many times it results in a net negative social cost. It is similar to a lottery in which a few will win large sums of money while the rest lose small bits of money .

This social cost from rent-seeking is also much greater than that of lobbying. Bribery began to be common as regulation is viewed as undesirable, leading to more rent-seeking. Rent wouldn't come from the population but rather from bribes. More measurements need to be done as even though equilibrium is created, it is a pseudo-equilibrium where the expected value is negative. We must evaluate the social cost of monopolies and the fees/bribery associated with them .

See also
 Semi-variable cost
 Cost curve
 Total cost of acquisition
 Total cost of ownership

References

Costs

2. Fuss, M. A. (1987, January 1). Production and Cost Functions. https://link.springer.com/referenceworkentry/10.1057/978-1-349-95121-5_1668-1.